Neoschoenobia testacealis, the flower stalk-boring moth, is a moth in the family Crambidae. It was described by George Hampson in 1900. It is found in China, the Russian Far East and Japan.

The larvae feed on Nuphar subintegerrima. They bore the flower stalks of their host plant.

References

Acentropinae
Moths described in 1900
Taxa named by George Hampson